Kennington is a suburb of Ashford and civil parish in Kent, England. It is about a mile northeast of the town centre and north of the M20 motorway, and contains the 12th-century church, St Mary's. The main A28 Canterbury Road and A2042 Faversham Road run through the village, and the A251 Trinity Road skirts the western edge. In recent years the village has expanded with the building of new housing estates in Little Burton,  Trinity Road, Conningbrook Lakes, and planned for Conningbrook Park and Eureka Park.

The Great Stour river and the Kennington stream run through the area.

History 

From The History and Topographical Survey of the County of Kent: Volume 7, (Edward Hasted, originally published by W Bristow, Canterbury, 1798):

"KENNINGTON IS the adjoining parish, northward from Ashford, and was so called, most probably, from its having antiently belonged to some of the Saxon kings during the heptarchy. Kennington, or as it was written in Saxon, Cining-tune, signifying in that language, the king's town; and there is at this time a small street of houses northward of the village of Kennington, called King-street.

THE PARISH is situated in a healthy country, being for the most part a gravelly, though not an unfertile soil, not much more than a mile from Ashford, close to the west side of the high road from Canterbury, which is joined by that from Faversham, which runs along the opposite side of the parish, and joins the former a little beyond Burton. It is watered by two small streams which rise northward of it, the one at Sandyhurst, the other near Eastwell park; the former running by Bybrooke, where it is called Bacon's water, and the other at the opposite part of the parish, by Clipmill and Frogbrook, near Wilsborough lees, into the river Stour, which flows along the eastern side of the parish. The village is situated on rising ground, at a small distance from the Canterbury road, with the church at the further end of it, close to the edge of the lees, or heath, called Kennington lees. [...]

There is a fair held here for pedlary, toys, &c. on the 5th of July yearly" 

https://www.british-history.ac.uk/survey-kent/vol7/pp545-557

Local Government 
Kennington was an ancient parish, and designated a civil parish under the Poor Law Amendment Act 1866, able to set its own Poor Rate. This was reformed under the Local Government Act 1894. In 1934 the civil parish was abolished and absorbed into Ashford Urban District Council (later Ashford Borough Council).

Following a Community Governance Review, new Borough ward boundaries took effect effect from May 2019. Kennington gained representation through a new civil parish council formed on 1 April 2019, with the title Kennington Community Council. The new Borough and Community Council wards are as follows:

Elections to Kennington Community Council are held every four years, on the same date as elections to Ashford Borough Council. The next election is on 4 May 2023.

Schools 
There is one secondary school in the village, the Towers School, with a local junior school, Kennington CE Academy, and an infants school, Downs View Infants School. Since the county still operates a grammar school system, those who pass the Kent Test (which replaced the 11+) are given the opportunity to attend the grammar school in Ashford, the Norton Knatchbull School or Highworth Grammar School.

Amenities 

Kennington is home to 1st Kennington Scout group, a long running scout group that includes all factions of the Scouting association; Beavers, Cubs, Scouts, Explorers (also known as 'Big Cubs'), and a highly successful branch of Network, dubbed 'The Roosters', featuring local minor celebrity 'Little' John Sheret.

Kennington has four pubs, "The Old Mill" (formerly The Golden Ball), "The Conningbrook Hotel" (formerly The Pilgrims Rest), "The Rose Inn", "The Pheasant" and "The Kennington Carvery".

Kennington Summer Fayre is held annually, usually on the last Saturday in June. It is a not-for-profit event, raising money for local causes.

Two areas of Kennington were designated as Conservation Areas in 1996, covering parts of Ball Lane, The Street, Ulley Road, Upper Vicarage Road, and Faversham Road.

Demography 

At the 2021 UK census, Kennington had a population of 10,900 (59,597,500 people in England and Wales), of which Female 52.1% and Male 47.9%. The age distribution across Kennington was: 0–19 years 25.1%, 20–39 years 21.9%, 40–59 years 26.4%, 60–79 years 20.6%, 80 years and over 16.1%.

National identity 
 One or more UK identity only 92.5%
 UK identity and non-UK identity 1.7%
 Non-UK identity only 5.8%

Economic activity status 
 Economically active: In employment 57.3%
 Economically active: Unemployed 2.5%
 Economically inactive 40.2%

Occupation 
 Managers, directors and senior officials 13.3%
 Professional occupations 19.8%
 Associate professional and technical occupations 12.5%
 Administrative and secretarial occupations 10.0%
 Skilled trades occupations 10.7%
 Caring, leisure and other service occupations 9.2%
 Sales and customer service occupations 8.9%
 Process, plant and machine operatives 6.3%
 Elementary occupations 9.2%

Highest level of qualification 
 No qualifications 18.7%
 Level 1, 2 or 3 qualifications 44.3%
 Apprenticeship 5.8%
 Level 4 qualifications and above 28.1%
 Other qualifications 3.1%

Tenure of household 
 Owns outright 37.6%
 Owns with a mortgage or loan or shared ownership 33.9%
 Social rented 15.7%
 Private rented or lives rent free 12.8%

Accommodation type 
 Whole house or bungalow 90.4%
 Flat, maisonette or apartment 9.5%
 A caravan or other mobile or temporary structure 0.1%

Household deprivation 
 Household is not deprived in any dimension 46.9%
 Household is deprived in one dimension 35.4%
 Household is deprived in two dimensions 14.7%
 Household is deprived in three dimensions 2.9%
 Household is deprived in four dimensions 0.1%

Religion 
 No religion 40.7%
 Christian 48.6%
 Buddhist 0.7%
 Hindu 2.1%
 Jewish 0.2%
 Muslim 1.7%
 Sikh 0.1%
 Other religion 0.7%
 Not answered 5.2%

Number of cars or vans 
 No cars or vans in household 15.6%
 1 car or van in household 40.2%
 2 cars or vans in household 32.8%
 3 or more cars or vans in household 11.4%

References

External links 
 The History and Topographical Survey of the County of Kent: Volume 7, by Edward Hasted, (Canterbury, 1798), pp. 545–557, at the Kennington Parish section.
 Open Domesday Book, by Anna Powell-Smith, at the Kennington settlement section.

Villages in Kent
Ashford, Kent
Civil parishes in Kent